Franck Moutsinga (born 12 August 1985) is a German international rugby union player, playing for the Berliner RC in the Rugby-Bundesliga and the German national rugby union team.

Biography
Moutsinga started playing rugby for the Berliner Rugby Club when he was five years old, in 1990.
He is currently playing for the Berliner Rugby Club, together with Gerrit van Look and Colin Grzanna, another two players of the German national team.
Before playing in the German 1st XV and German Sevens Side, Moutsinga played two Under 19 World Championships in Italy (2002) and France (2003).

Playing for Berlin for the most part of his career, Moutsinga spent the 2005/06 season with the Racing Club Strasbourg in France (2nd Amateur League) before returning to Berlin again.

He was part of the German Sevens side at the World Games 2005 in Duisburg, where Germany finished 8th and played two tournaments of the IRB Sevens Series in 2006 in Paris (France) and London  (England). During that two tournaments Moutsinga scored three tries, one of it in Twickenham Stadium. In his young age of 23 years, the scrum-half spent three final European Championships Tournaments in Moskau/Russia (2005 and 2007) and in Hannover (2008) with the Sevens Team of Germany. He was also again part of the team at the 2009 Hannover Sevens, the final-round of the European Sevens Championship 2009.

He was part of the German team at the 2009 London Sevens.

Moutsinga's last game for the German XV was a friendly against Switzerland in 2007. He also sat on the bench on three of Germany's European nations Cup matches in 2006–08, but was not used in any of them.

Honours

National team
 European Nations Cup - Division 2
 Champions: 2008

Stats
Franck Moutsinga's personal statistics in club and international rugby:

Club

 As of 30 April 2012

National team

European Nations Cup

Friendlies & other competitions

 As of 27 February 2010

References

External links
 Franck Moutsinga profile at totalrugby.de
 Franck Moutsinga profile at the Berliner RC website
 Franck Moutsinga profile at the World Games 2005 website

1985 births
Living people
German rugby union players
Germany international rugby union players
Berliner RC players
Rugby union scrum-halves
Sportspeople from Berlin